This is a list of notable Deportivo Saprissa players - footballers who have played for the Costa Rica football club. Generally, this refers to players who are considered to have made significant contributions to the club's history and includes players with Wikipedia articles as well as those without articles.

Players are listed by those decades during which they were at the club. Note that some players' Saprissa careers spanned more than one decade, hence their names are repeated accordingly.

Notable players
Note: The Players marked '(c)' have also coached the team

1950s
 Sean Sanabria
 Rodolfo Sanabria
 Carlos Lopez
 Greivin Zumbado
 Rigoberto Rojas (Feo) (c)
 Jorge Hernan Monge (Cuty) 
 Marvin Rodríguez (c)
 Mario Pérez (Flaco) 
 Guillermo Hernández (Coco) (c)
 Constantino Quirós
 Jose Soto
 Ulises Aguero
 Carlos Vivó Gobán
 Giovanny Rodríguez (c)
 Rodolfo Herrera
 Alex Sánchez
 Rubén Jiménez (Rata) 
 Álvaro Murillo

1960s
 Mario Cordero (Catato) (c)
 Marvin Rodríguez (c)
 Mario Pérez (Flaco) 
 Rigoberto Rojas (Feo) (c)
 Jorge Hernan Monge (Cuty) 
 Rodolfo Umaña
 Eduardo Umaña (Mudo) 
 Hernan Carboni
 Guillermo Hernández (Coco) (c)
 Giovanny Rodríguez (c)
 Álvaro Murillo
 Miguel Cortes
 Victor Manuel Ruiz
 Edgar Marín
 Fernando Hernández (Principe) 
 Wálter Elizondo
 Eduardo Chavarria (Lalo) 
 Jaime Grant (Jimmy)

1970s
 Edgar Marín
 Fernando Hernández (Principe) 
 Carlos Solano
 Marco Antonio Rojas
 Wilberth Barquero
 Juan Gutiérrez
 Carlos Santana (c)
 Francisco Hernández
 Heriberto Rojas
 Javier Masís (Michelin) 
 Fernando Solano
 Hernán Morales
 Gerardo Ureña (Puro) 
 Jose Manuel Rojas (Chinimba) 
 Odir Jaques (c)
 Asdrubal Paniagua (Yuba) 
 Gerardo Solano

1980s
 Evaristo Coronado (c)
 Hernán Medford (Pelicano) (c)
  Alexandre Guimarães (Guima) (c)
 Benjamín Mayorga (Indio) 
 Enrique Díaz (Zancudo) 
 Alexánder Sáenz
 Luis Fernández
 Rodrigo Kenton
 Alexis Camacho
 Juan Arnoldo Cayasso
 Marco Antonio Rojas
 Rónald Mora (Macho) 
 Roger Flores (Capitano) 
 Enrique Rivers (c)
 Guillermo Guardia
 Carlos Mario Hidalgo
 Vladimir Quesada (c) 
 Freddy Méndez
 Tomás Segura
 Miguel Segura
 Jorge Jiménez
 José Jaikel
 Carlos Vivó Quirós
 Rolando Villalobos (Cadaver) (c)
 Gerardo Ureña (Puro)

1990s
 Evaristo Coronado (c)
 Hernán Medford (Pelicano) (c)
  Alexandre Guimarães (Guima) (c)
 Benjamín Mayorga (Indio) 
 Enrique Díaz (Zancudo)
 Juan Arnoldo Cayasso
 Marvin Obando
 Victor Badilla
 Roger Flores (Capitano) 
 Edwin Salazar (Sarapiqui)
 Giancarlo Morera
 Erick Lonnis (Capi) 
 Max Sánchez
 Jervis Drummond
 Hermidio Barrantes
 Juan Carlos Arguedas
 Rolando Fonseca
 Ronald González (c)
 Mauricio Wright
 Randall Row
 Roy Myers (Maravilloso) (c) 
 Gerald Drummond
 Víctor Cordero
 Jeaustin Campos (c)
 Steven Bryce
 Javier Wanchope
 Oscar Ramírez (Machillo) 
 Vladimir Quesada (c) 
 Adrián Mahía
 Adonis Hilario
 Alejandro Larrea

2000s to date
 Álvaro Saborío (Sabo)
 Walter Centeno (Paté) (c) 
 Jervis Drummond
 Rónald Gómez (La Bala)
 José Francisco Porras (Porritas)
 Ronald González (c) 
 Juan Bautista Esquivel (Juancho)
 Gilberto Martínez (El Tuma)
 Alonso Solís (El Mariachi)
 Víctor Cordero
 Daniel Torres
 Try Bennett (Triqui - Triqui)
 Douglas Sequeira (c) 
 Amado Guevara ("El Lobo")
 José Luis Cancela
 José Luis López Ramírez (El Pupy)
 Christian Bolaños
 Gabriel Badilla (Gladiador)
 Wilson Muñoz
 Randall Azofeifa
 Gerald Drummond (El Venado)
 Allan Aleman (El Super Raton)
 Keylor Navas (Halcon)
 Celso Borges 

 
Saprissa

Association football player non-biographical articles